Altru Health System is an American healthcare provider headquartered in Grand Forks, North Dakota. Altru is a nonprofit organization that serves a region with a population of roughly 225,000. It employs 3,500 people including a 160+ physician medical group. Altru was formed from a merger of the former United Hospital and the Grand Forks Clinic. It is the second largest healthcare provider in North Dakota, after Sanford Health in Fargo, North Dakota.

Facilities

Altru Health System's facilities include a 257-bed acute care hospital, a 45-bed specialty center, 14 clinics across eastern North Dakota and northwest Minnesota, and a retirement community for senior citizens (Parkwood Place). The Altru Hospital has been designated a Level II trauma center.

Altru Health Systems facilities in Grand Forks include the following: 
 Altru 1300 Columbia, 1300 S. Columbia Road
 Altru 860 Columbia, 860 S. Columbia Road
 Altru Business Center, 2401 DeMers Avenue
 Altru Cancer Center, 960 S. Columbia Road
 Altru Family Medicine Center, 1380 S. Columbia Road
 Altru Family Medicine Residency, 725 Hamline Street
 Altru Health Foundation, 2501 DeMers Avenue
 Altru Hospital, 1200 S. Columbia Road
 Altru Professional Center, 4440 S. Washington Street
 Altru Performance Center, 1375 S. Columbia Road
 Altru Specialty Center, 4500 S. Washington Street
 Dak Minn Blood Bank, 3375 DeMers Avenue
 Sanny and Jerry Ryan Center for Prevention and Genetics, 4401 South 11th Street
 Truyu Aesthetic Center, 3165 DeMers Avenue
 Truyu at Choice Health & Fitness, 4401 South 11th Street

Altru clinics are located in the following cities in Minnesota and North Dakota:
Altru Clinc, Crookston, Minnesota
Altru Clinc, Devils Lake, North Dakota
Altru Clinc, Drayton, North Dakota
Altru Clinic, East Grand Forks Clinic, Minnesota
Altru Clinic, Erskine, Minnesota
Altru Clinic, Fertile, Minnesota
Altru Clinic, Greenbush, Minnesota
Altru Clinic, Red Lake Falls, Minnesota
Altru Clinic, Roseau, Minnesota
Altru Clinic, Thief River Falls, Minnesota
Altru Clinic, Warroad, Minnesota
Altru’s Specialty Care, Cavalier, North Dakota

History
In May 2005, Altru Health System announced a $100 million expansion and renovation of its Grand Forks campus. The project took place over a five-year period. Virtually every facility on the campus was completely renovated and expanded. Altru also announced the hiring of 38 new physicians and 400 other medical personnel as part of the plan.

References

Greater Grand Forks
Companies based in North Dakota